Magat may refer to:

Magat Dam, a rock-filled dam located at the Magat River
Magat River, a river in the Philippines
Magat Salamat, son of Lakan Dula of the Kingdom of Tondo
"MAGAt", a derogatory term used for the far-right supporters of Donald Trump, named for his slogan "Make America Great Again" (MAGA)

See also

BRP Magat Salamat (PS-20), a Philippine Navy vessel named after the historic figure